Arthur Williams was a New Zealand cricketer. He played one first-class match for Auckland in 1927/28.

See also
 List of Auckland representative cricketers

References

External links
 

Year of birth missing
Year of death missing
New Zealand cricketers
Auckland cricketers
Place of birth missing